The Lindstrom Peninsula is located on the southern coast of Ellesmere Island, a part of the Qikiqtaaluk Region of the Canadian territory of Nunavut. Across Baffin Bay to the south lies Devon Island. Harbour Fiord and Landslip Island are to the west, while the Grise Fiord is to the east. The highest peak on the peninsula is Mount Aqiatushuk .

In 1953, a small group of Inuit families were resettled on the Lindstrom Peninsula, and others to Craig Harbour, a Royal Canadian Mounted Police trading post  who moved to the Lindstrom Peninsula shortly after their arrival. By the 1960s, they developed a community at what is now the Inuit hamlet of Grise Fiord,  to the east.

References

External links
 Landscape painting of Lindstrom Peninsula and the Grise Fiord

Ellesmere Island
Peninsulas of Qikiqtaaluk Region